Hajjiabad (also Romanized as Ḩājjīābād) is a village in Charuymaq-e Jonubegharbi Rural District, in the Central District of Charuymaq County, East Azerbaijan Province, Iran. At the 2006 census, its population was 41, in 9 families.

References 

Populated places in Charuymaq County